Kenneth,  Kenny, or Ken Harrison may refer to:

 Kenneth Harrison (POW) (1918–1982), Australian WWII prisoner of war
 Kenneth Harrison (serial killer) (1938–1989), serial killer
 Kenneth A. Harrison (1901–1991), Canadian mycologist
 Kenny Harrison (born 1965 as Kerry Harrison), track and field athlete
 Kenny Harrison (American football) (born 1953), football wide receiver
 Ken H. Harrison (born 1940), British comics artist at DC Thomson
 Ken Harrison (footballer) (1926–2010), English footballer for Hull City and Derby County
 Ken Harrison, member of Canadian band Wild Strawberries
 Kenneth Harrison, a character in the television series Mutant X

See also
 Harrison (name)
 R. K. Harrison
 Kenneth Albury